James Montague or Montagu may refer to:

 James Montagu (MP) (died 1666), MP for Huntingdon (UK Parliament constituency)
 James Montague (bishop) (1568–1618), English bishop
 James J. Montague (1873–1941), American writer and poet
 James Montagu (Royal Navy officer) (1752–1794), captain in the Royal Navy
 James Montagu (judge) (1666–1723), English barrister, and judge
 James Piotr Montague (born 1979), British writer and journalist